Salinicola halophilus is a gram negative, oxidase and catalase positive, motile, salt tolerant marine bacteria. S.I. Paul et al. (2021) isolated, characterized and identified  Salinicola halophilus from marine sponges (Plakortis dariae) of the Saint Martin's Island area of the Bay of Bengal, Bangladesh.

Biochemical characteristics of Salinicola halophilus 
Colony, morphological, physiological, and biochemical characteristics of Salinicola halophilus are shown in the Table below.

Note: + = Positive, – =Negative, V =Variable (+/–)

References 

Gram-negative bacteria
Marine organisms